Horserace may refer to:
 Horse racing
 Horserace (drinking game)